Ahwahnee is a census-designated place in Madera County, California, United States. The population was 2,296 at the 2020 census.

Ahwahnee is hilly and located in the Sierra Nevada. The ZIP Code is 93601. The community is inside area code 559. It is part of the Madera–Chowchilla Metropolitan Statistical Area.

History
The Ahwahnee post office opened in 1893 to 1896. The name, "Ahwahnee", is derived from the Southern Sierra Miwok word awwo, which in English means "mouth". The Gertrude post office was transferred to and renamed "Ahwahnee" in 1900, closed in 1907, and re-opened in 1917.

Demographics

2010
At the 2010 census Ahwahnee had a population of 2,246. The racial makeup of Ahwahnee was 2,064 (91.9%) White, 6 (0.3%) African American, 30 (1.3%) Native American, 16 (0.7%) Asian, 0 (0.0%) Pacific Islander, 38 (1.7%) from other races, and 92 (4.1%) from two or more races. Hispanic or Latino of any race were 196 people (8.7%).

The census reported that 2,240 people (99.7% of the population) lived in households, no one lived in non-institutionalized group quarters and 6 (0.3%) were institutionalized.

There were 898 households, 218 (24.3%) had children under the age of 18 living in them, 541 (60.2%) were opposite-sex married couples living together, 87 (9.7%) had a female householder with no husband present, 46 (5.1%) had a male householder with no wife present.  There were 45 (5.0%) unmarried opposite-sex partnerships, and 21 (2.3%) same-sex married couples or partnerships. 170 households (18.9%) were one person and 105 (11.7%) had someone living alone who was 65 or older. The average household size was 2.49.  There were 674 families (75.1% of households); the average family size was 2.81.

The age distribution was 421 people (18.7%) under the age of 18, 166 people (7.4%) aged 18 to 24, 396 people (17.6%) aged 25 to 44, 705 people (31.4%) aged 45 to 64, and 558 people (24.8%) who were 65 or older.  The median age was 49.4 years. For every 100 females, there were 93.8 males.  For every 100 females age 18 and over, there were 92.7 males.

There were 1,030 housing units at an average density of 102.8 per square mile, of the occupied units 711 (79.2%) were owner-occupied and 187 (20.8%) were rented. The homeowner vacancy rate was 4.2%; the rental vacancy rate was 6.9%.  1,737 people (77.3% of the population) lived in owner-occupied housing units and 503 people (22.4%) lived in rental housing units.

References

 United States Census.

Census-designated places in Madera County, California
Census-designated places in California